When Pigs Fly may refer to:

 When pigs fly, a figure of speech to express impossibility
 When Pigs Fly (Vollmer album), 1990
 When Pigs Fly: Songs You Never Thought You'd Hear (Cevin Soling album), a compilation album of covers by various artists, 2002
 When Pigs Fly (The Chicharones album), 2005
 When Pigs Fly (musical), a 1996 musical revue
 When Pigs Fly (film), a 1993 film directed by Sara Driver
 When Pigs Fly Incorporated, a television production company owned by Gary Glasberg

See also
 Flying Pig Marathon
 Pigasus (disambiguation)
 Pigs Can Fly (disambiguation)